Lambeth Bridge is a road traffic and footbridge crossing the River Thames in an east–west direction in central London. The river flows north at the crossing point. Downstream, the next bridge is Westminster Bridge; upstream, the next bridge is Vauxhall Bridge.

The most conspicuous colour in the bridge's paint scheme is red, the same colour as the leather benches in the House of Lords, which is at the southern end of the Palace of Westminster nearest the bridge. This is in contrast to Westminster Bridge, which is predominantly green, the same colour as the benches in the House of Commons at the northern end of the Houses of Parliament.

On the east side, in Lambeth, are Lambeth Palace, the Albert Embankment, St. Thomas' Hospital, and the International Maritime Organization. On the west side, in Westminster, are Thames House (the headquarters of MI5), behind which is Horseferry House (the National Probation Service headquarters), and Clelland House and Abell House (the headquarters of HM Prison Service), and the Millbank Tower and Tate Britain. The Palace of Westminster is a short walk downstream to the north through the Victoria Tower Garden.

History

Lambeth Bridge is on the site of a horse ferry between the Palace of Westminster and Lambeth Palace on the south bank. Its name lives on in Horseferry Road, which forms the approach to the bridge on the north bank.

Sanctioned by an Act of Parliament in 1860, it opened as a toll bridge on 10 November 1862. Doubts about its safety, coupled with its awkwardly steep approaches deterring horse-drawn traffic, meant it soon became used almost solely as a pedestrian crossing. It ceased to be a toll bridge in 1879 when the Metropolitan Board of Works assumed responsibility for its upkeep — it was by then severely corroded, and by 1910 it was closed to vehicular traffic.

The London County Council prepared a masterplan for the area, including a replacement road bridge linking to a widened Horseferry Road, which was authorised by London County Council (Lambeth Bridge) Act 1924. Before work had started on the project, the 1928 Thames flood caused extensive destruction of property in the Millbank area. Following the flood the Chelsea Embankment was rebuilt and raised, resulting in some minor redesign of the approaches, and creating the open space to the north of Lambeth Bridge now known as Victoria Tower Gardens South.  During the period of delay, the bridge was also redesigned to be able to cope with a higher weight of motorised traffic.

The current structure, a five-span steel arch, designed by engineer Sir George Humphreys and  architects Sir Reginald Blomfield and G. Topham Forrest, was built by Dorman Long and opened on 19 July 1932 by King George V. It formerly carried four lanes of road traffic (now reduced to three lanes, one of which is a buses-only lane flowing eastbound) from a roundabout junction by the Lambeth Palace northwards to another roundabout, where the Millbank road meets Horseferry Road .

The bridge is notable at road level for the pairs of obelisks at either end of the bridge, which are surmounted by stone pinecones.   However, there is a popular urban legend that they are pineapples, as a tribute to Lambeth resident John Tradescant the younger, who is said to have grown the first pineapple in Britain.

The bridge was declared a Grade II listed structure in 2008, providing protection to preserve its special character from unsympathetic development.  The listing designation includes the parapets, lamps, obelisks and the approach walls.

See also
 List of bridges in London
List of crossings of the River Thames

References

External links

Survey of London entry
 
 
 London Transport Museum Photographic Archive
 
 

Transport in the City of Westminster
Transport in the London Borough of Lambeth
Grade II listed buildings in the City of Westminster
Grade II listed buildings in the London Borough of Lambeth
Bridges completed in 1862
History of the London Borough of Lambeth
Rebuilt buildings and structures in the United Kingdom
Bridges completed in 1932
Bridges across the River Thames
Reginald Blomfield buildings
Former toll bridges in England
1862 establishments in England
Bridges in London
Grade II listed bridges in London
Bridge light displays